Dahlak Subregion is a subregion in the Northern Red Sea region of Eritrea. It is the administrative subregion that covers the islands of the Dahlak Archipelago. The capital lies at Jimhil.

Overview
Dahlak Subregion consists of two large and 124 small islands. Only four of the islands are permanently inhabited, of which Dahlak Kebir is the largest and most populated. The islands are a home for diverse marine life and sea-birds, and attract some tourists.

The archipelago's inhabitants speak Dahlik. Some of the islands can be reached by boat from Massawa.

Other inhabited islands of the district, besides Dahlak Kebir are: Dhuladhiya, Dissei, Dehil (Dohul), Erwa, Harat, Hermil, Isra-Tu, Nahaleg (Nahleg), Nora (Norah) and Shumma, although only Dissei, Dehil and Nora are permanently inhabited.

Administrative Subdivision
Dhalak Subregion is administratively subdivided into eight villages:

Aranat
Cumbeiba
Debe'aluwa
Jimhil
Nokra
Port Smyth
Sahelia
Sceic Abdo Raama

References Akrur Eritrea

Subregions of Eritrea

Dahlak Archipelago
Northern Red Sea Region
Subregions of Eritrea